Syllitus bicolor is a species of beetle in the family Cerambycidae. It was described by Schwarzer in 1924.

References

Stenoderini
Beetles described in 1924